GiveSendGo is a Christian crowdfunding website founded in 2014.

The website was founded as a response to GoFundMe removing campaigns that they did not agree with. Since its founding, the site has received increased traffic following the removal of campaigns from other crowdfunding websites, and as a result, gained a reputation for facilitating the funding of far-right activists and extremist groups, such as the Proud Boys. This reputation has been criticized as being counter to its Christian mission statement.

In January 2022, the British anti-disinformation organization Logically reported that GiveSendGo was the hub for a far-right funding network that included QAnon supporters, anti-vaccine activists and the far-right group Project Veritas.

Controversies

Kyle Rittenhouse

A GiveSendGo campaign for Kyle Rittenhouse raised over $250,000, while similar campaigns on GoFundMe and Fundly were removed. In response, Discover blocked transactions toward GiveSendGo. It was the Kyle Rittenhouse campaign that is cited as the event that gave GiveSendGo its reputation as a refuge for campaigns too controversial for other crowdfunding sites.

2021 United States Capitol attack

PayPal suspended payments to GiveSendGo during a campaign to raise funds following the attack on the US Capitol.

Canadian convoy protests 2022
In early February 2022, supporters of the trucker convoy occupying Ottawa, the Canadian capital, and blocking border crossings between Canada and the U.S. to protest COVID-19 vaccine mandates and restrictions, raised over $8 million on the GiveSendGo platform.

On February 10, 2022, a statement was issued by Ontario's premier, Doug Ford, stating that the Ontario Superior Court of Justice, upon request from the Ontario provincial Government, has granted a restraining order against the company, intended to freeze all donations raised for the protesters. The GiveSendGo founders responded on Twitter that any funds raised via GiveSendGo flow directly to the campaign recipients, denied that the funds are actually frozen, and denied that Canada has jurisdiction over GiveSendGo management.

During parliamentary questioning in March 2022, co-founder Jacob Wells stated that GiveSendGo would permit the Ku Klux Klan and the Proud Boys to fundraise on their website, provided the activity was legal. Since February 2021, the Proud Boys have been designated as a terrorist group by the Canadian government.

Data security 
A report by TechCrunch on February 8, 2022 noted that a security lapse had exposed the personal information of donors.

On the early morning of February 11, 2022, the GiveSendGo website was hacked and redirected to givesendgone.wtf, which displayed a message condemning the website, the Freedom Convoy and their sympathizers as a threat to democracy. A video from the Disney film Frozen II was set as a backdrop to the statement calling the donors and protesters "hatriots", "grifters" and "assholes" and focusing on scenarios of domestic or foreign influenced insurgencies disguised as protests.

A link to a .csv file, allegedly containing names of Freedom Convoy donors, was also posted. Shortly after the hack was noticed and began trending on the social media, the website domain was restored. The GiveSendGo website was not operational as of February 14, instead, displaying the message "Application is under maintenance we will be back very soon."

A data breach on February 13, 2022 was reported by Vice News. The breach revealed the personal details of 92,845 donors to the Freedom Convoy fundraising campaign, including a $90,000 donation by American software billionaire Thomas Siebel. Of the 92,845 donations, 55.7% of donors were from the United States, and 39% from Canada. Some of the American donors' names correspond to the names of donors to Donald Trump's campaigns. Some members of the Ontario Provincial Police (OPP) were revealed to have donated to the convoy on GiveSendGo, prompting the OPP to launch an internal conduct investigation.

A data breach on February 15, 2022 was reported by The Daily Dot. The data included a full database dump, source code for their Bitbucket repo, information from their customer service systems and some credit card information. The Daily Dot claimed GiveSendGo had been warned about the vulnerability in 2018.

On February 24, 2022, another data breach was reported by The Daily Dot. The data included more information on donors to the Freedom Convoy fundraiser.

Convoy to Canberra 
The Convoy to Canberra anti-vaccine mandate protest in Australia was organized on GiveSendGo, among other platforms.

References

External links 
 

Financial services companies established in 2014
Crowdfunding platforms of the United States
American companies established in 2014
Internet properties established in 2014